Eyes in the Dark: The Curious Case of One Victoria Bloom is a rogue-lite platform video game developed by Zagreb-based studio Under the Stairs and published by Gearbox Publishing on 14 July 2022.

Gameplay 
Eyes in the Dark originated as a game-jam project in which you play as Victoria, who visits the Bloom Manor to see her grandfather. When he is kidnapped by shadow monsters, the player uses a flashlight as a mechanic in order to repel darkness and the monsters within in procedurally generated areas. All tools used are customizable and intended to be used strategically.

Reception 

Eyes in the Dark: The Curious Case of One Victoria Bloom received "generally favorable" reviews according to review aggregator Metacritic.

Marcus Stewart, writing for Game Informer, gave an initial impression in which he described the game as having unique gameplay and a striking art direction. VG247 gave it a perfect 5 out of 5 score, stating "there’s a huge avenue of endless fun and exploration here that feels incredibly fresh, and honestly, flawless". A review for the The Escapist, likewise praised its visuals, but also its replayability, but criticized the fact that the controls can be a bit floaty in spots.

References 

2022 video games
Video games developed in Croatia
Windows games